Michael Cutler is a male British former sports shooter.

Sports shooting career
Cutler represented England and won a silver medal in the centre fire pistol pairs with Bob Northover, at the 1986 Commonwealth Games in Edinburgh, Scotland.

References

Living people
British male sport shooters
Shooters at the 1986 Commonwealth Games
Commonwealth Games medallists in shooting
Commonwealth Games silver medallists for England
Year of birth missing (living people)
Medallists at the 1986 Commonwealth Games